James Scott Thompson (born 11 March 1991) is an English former first-class cricketer.

Jamie was born at Shrewsbury in March 1991. He was educated at Hurstpierpoint College, before going up to Oxford Brookes University. While studying at Oxford Brookes, he made two appearances in first-class cricket for Oxford MCCU, playing against Glamorgan and Worcestershire at Oxford in 2012 and 2013 respectively. He scored 32 runs in his two matches, in addition to taking a single wicket, that of Glamorgan's Ben Wright. 

After graduating from Oxford Brookes, Thompson became an osteopath. He has worked in his capacity for both Middlesex County Cricket Club and Tottenham Hotspur.

Notes and references

External links

1991 births
Living people
Sportspeople from Shrewsbury
People educated at Hurstpierpoint College
Alumni of Oxford Brookes University
English cricketers
Oxford MCCU cricketers